Kounotori 4, also known as HTV-4, was the fourth flight of the H-II Transfer Vehicle, an uncrewed cargo spacecraft launched in August 2013 to resupply the International Space Station. It launched from Tanegashima Space Center aboard H-IIB No. 4 (H-IIB F4) rocket on 3 August 2013 and connected to ISS by 9 August 2013; it carried  of cargo. Kounotori 4 undocked on 4 September 2013 and was destroyed by reentry on 7 September 2013.

Specifications 
Major changes of Kounotori 4 from previous HTV are:

 Although the previous Kounotori 3 used reaction control system (RCS) thrusters by IHI Aerospace, Kounotori 4 uses the RCS manufactured by Aerojet, similar to HTV-1 and Kounotori 2. This will be the last Kounotori to use Aerojet parts, and future Kounotori are to use IHI's.
 One of the solar panels was replaced with a sensor module to measure the surface electrical potential when berthing to ISS.
 Continued improvement of ground operation to allow more late access cargo.
 First time for Kounotori to reenter the atmosphere with unpressurized waste cargo (a NASA engineering experiment module STP-H3).
 The orbital trajectory after departure from ISS is adjusted so that the reentry is to coincide with ISS passing over, to allow the atmospheric entry to be observed from ISS.

Cargo 

Pressurized cargo include: CANA (Cabin network system for Kibō), Stirling-Cycle Refrigerator (FROST), ISS Cryogenic Experiment Storage Box (ICE Box), i-Ball and Re-Entry Data Recorder (REDR), four CubeSats: (PicoDragon, ArduSat-1, ArduSat-X, TechEdSat-3p), and the Kirobo (robot companion for Koichi Wakata).

Unpressurized cargo include: MBSU (Main Bus Switching Units) and UTA (Utility Transfer Assembly) which are ISS system spare parts, and a NASA experiment module STP-H4 (Space Test Program - Houston 4).

Operation

Launch and rendezvous with ISS 

Kounotori 4 was successfully launched atop a H-IIB carrier rocket flying from pad 2 of the Yoshinobu Launch Complex at Tanegashima Space Center at 19:48:46 UTC on 3 August 2013. After 5.5 days of orbital manoeuvres, it arrived to Approach Initiation Point ( behind ISS) at 05:31 UTC, 9 August 2013, and started the final approach sequence at 08:05 UTC. The ISS's robotic arm Canadarm2 grappled Kounotori 4 at 11:22 UTC, and fastened to ISS's Common berthing mechanism (CBM) on 16:32 UTC. All berthing operations were completed at 18:38 UTC.

Operation while berthed to ISS 
The ISS crew opened the hatch and entered to Pressurized Logistics Carrier (PLC) at 11:11 UTC, 10 August 2013.

Departure from ISS and reentry to Earth atmosphere 
Kounotori 4 undocked from the ISS at 16:20 UTC, on 4 September 2013, Karen Nyberg then used the stations Canadarm2 to manoeuvre HTV-4 away from the International Space Station.

Trajectory after the release was controlled so that the reentry coincides with ISS passing over to observe it. Japanese flight controllers have deorbited HTV-4 on 06:11 UTC, on 7 September 2013, and it reentered to the atmosphere around 06:37 UTC, on7 September 2013.

Notes

References

External links 

 HTV4 (Kounotori 4) Official page (JAXA)
  (JAXA channel)
  (JAXA channel)
  (JAXA channel)
 HTV-4 Mission Updates, Spaceflight101.com

Spacecraft launched in 2013
H-II Transfer Vehicles
2013 in Japan
Spacecraft which reentered in 2013